John Wallace Chisholm, (14 September 192324 May 1975) was an Australian divine who served as the tenth Anglican Bishop of Melanesia and first Archbishop of the Province of Melanesia. He was educated at Trinity College, University of Melbourne and ordained in 1947. His first post was as a Curate at St Stephen's Church, Rochester Row, Westminster after which he was Sub-Dean of Ss Peter and Paul Cathedral, Dogura, Territory of Papua and New Guinea. From his consecration as a bishop on 24 February 1964 until 1967 he was an Auxiliary Bishop of the Diocese of New Guinea when he became Bishop of Melanesia, a post he held until 26 January 1975 when the Diocese of Melanesia became a province and he automatically became Archbishop of Melanesia (and Primate) and Bishop of Central Melanesia. He died on 24 May, shortly after signing the last paperwork of the Province's creation process.

References

 

1923 births
1975 deaths
Religious leaders from Melbourne
University of Melbourne alumni
People educated at Trinity College (University of Melbourne)
20th-century Anglican bishops in Oceania
Anglican bishops of Melanesia
Anglican archbishops of Melanesia